Love Exchange (Traditional Chinese: 疑情別戀) is a TVB modern thriller series that broadcast in July 2008.

Synopsis
When romance is dead,
Everything turns terrible and destructive.

A man and a woman are found dead inside a car. Zita Sit Chi-Yiu (Anita Yuen) learns that the man is her husband, Dick Ling Ho-Leung (Eddie Kwan), and the woman is called Bonnie Fong Cheuk-Ling (Angela Tong). While Zita is devastated by her husband's death, she is also heartbroken to come to know that he had an affair. Mike Yiu Lap-Tin (Michael Miu), a friend of Dick from school, shows up out of the blue and he cares a great deal about her. Later, Zita discovers that Mike, who works for a security firm, is in fact Bonnie's husband and that he is not a friend of Dick in the least.

The death of Dick also left Zita without a source of income. But Dick's boss, Anson Tsu Yeuk-Yue (Power Chan) has found Zita a job at the insurance company they work at. Although her supervisor, Jackie Ching Ngo-Yee (Crystal Tin), means to make things difficult for her, Zita takes it all. This makes Jackie change her view on Zita and the two have become good friends. Zita wants to get over her pain and stand on her own two feet but Mike is determined to find out about the truth of Dick and Bonnie's deaths. Zita has no choice but to give him a hand. However, the deeper they dig into the case, the more mysterious they find it. Zita cannot even judge who is friend and who is foe.

Cast

Viewership ratings

Awards and nominations
41st TVB Anniversary Awards (2008)
 "Best Drama"
 "Best Actor in a Leading Role" (Michael Miu - Mike Yiu Lap-Tin)
 "Best Actress in a Supporting Role" (Crystal Tin - Jackie Ching Ngo-Yee)

References

External links
TVB.com Love Exchange - Official Website 
K for TVB.net Love Exchange - Episodic Synopsis and Screen Captures 

TVB dramas
2008 Hong Kong television series debuts
2008 Hong Kong television series endings